Go-Ahead or Go Ahead may refer to:
Go-Ahead Group, British transport operator 
Go Ahead Eagles, Dutch football club
"Go Ahead", a single from Alicia Keys' album As I Am
"Go Ahead", a single from Rilo Kiley's album Take Offs and Landings
Go Ahead, the second album by Linx
Go Ahead (band), a band formed by Grateful Dead members Brent Mydland and Bill Kreutzmann
Go Ahead (TV series), a Chinese drama series first aired in 2020
Go Ahead!, a 1978 album by Tatsuro Yamashita